Chile competed in the 11th Pan American Games which were held in Havana, Cuba from August 2 to August 18, 1991.

Medalists

Results by event

See also
Chile at the Pan American Games
Chile at the 1992 Summer Olympics

External links
COCH - Comité Olimpico de Chile Official site.

Nations at the 1991 Pan American Games
Pan American Games
1991